Martin Q Larsson, born 3 May 1968 in Trollhättan, Sweden, is a Swedish composer, musician and incubator manager.

Larsson lives in Stockholm. In 2010-17 he was president of the Swedish Society of Composers, and board member of several culture organizations in Sweden and Europe.
Since 2018, he has been the director of Subtopia’s creative incubator Katapult. He is also president of creARTive, the national Swedish organization for creative incubators.

References

External links
Official website
Katapult
creARTive

1968 births
Living people
Swedish composers
Swedish male composers